The 1982–83 VfL Bochum season was the 45th season in club history.

Review and events

Matches

Legend

Bundesliga

DFB-Pokal

Squad

Squad and statistics

Squad, appearances and goals scored

Transfers

Summer

In:

Out:

Winter

In:

Out:

Sources

External links
 1982–83 VfL Bochum season at Weltfussball.de 
 1982–83 VfL Bochum season at kicker.de 
 1982–83 VfL Bochum season at Fussballdaten.de 

Bochum
VfL Bochum seasons